Catherine Delahunty (born 1953) is a New Zealand politician and environmentalist. From  until 2017 she was a member of parliament in the House of Representatives representing the Green Party.

During her time as an MP she served variously as the Green Party spokesperson on Education, Water, Toxics, Te Tiriti o Waitangi, Mining (Terrestrial), Forestry, Civil Defence, Disability Issues, Women's Affairs, Arts, Culture & Heritage, and the Community & Voluntary Sector.

Political career

Delahunty was the female co-convenor of the Green Party from 2003 to 2005. She has been placed high on the Greens' list for several years, just missing getting into Parliament on several occasions.

Member of Parliament

Delahunty was placed at number eight on the Green Party list for the 2008 election. She was elected as a Green Party MP and gained the fourth highest number of candidate votes in the East Coast electorate. In 2011 Delahunty was ranked at number 4 on the final Greens list for the 2011 general election.

In June 2009, Delahunty's Customs and Excise (Sustainable Forestry) Amendment Bill, which would have prohibited the import of timber produced unsustainably or illegally, was drawn from the member's ballot. The bill was defeated at its first reading.

In the 2014 general election, Delahunty was ranked number 6 on the Green Party list, a demotion of two places relative to her 2011 ranking. Despite that, Delahunty easily got reelected to parliament.

On 15 December 2016, she announced alongside Steffan Browning that she will not be seeking re-election in the 2017 general election.

Delahunty's sister is playwright Sarah Delahunty.

References

External links

Green Party – MP biography for Catherine Delahunty
Profile at New Zealand Parliament website

1953 births
Green Party of Aotearoa New Zealand MPs
Living people
Women members of the New Zealand House of Representatives
New Zealand list MPs
Unsuccessful candidates in the 2002 New Zealand general election
Unsuccessful candidates in the 2005 New Zealand general election
Members of the New Zealand House of Representatives
21st-century New Zealand politicians
21st-century New Zealand women politicians